1. SK Prostějov is a Czech football club from the town of Prostějov, currently participating in the second-level Czech National Football League. The club is most notable for their participation in the Czechoslovak First League in the 1930s and 1940s, during which time they finished in the top three three times, and also took part in European competition on two occasions.

History
The club was formed in 1904 as Sportovní kroužek Prostějov, before being renamed SK Prostějov in 1907. Prostějov took part in the Czechoslovak First League for the first time in the 1934–35 season, going on to third-placed finishes in the 1935–36 and 1936–37 seasons. They reached the final of the national cup in 1940, losing 5–2 on aggregate to SK Olomouc. In the 1941–42 season, the club achieved its best domestic result, finishing second in the table behind Slavia Prague. In the 1945–46 season the club was relegated from the First League. The club then appeared among the second, third and fourth levels of football in Czechoslovakia and later the Czech Republic.

After the 2002–03 Czech 2. Liga, Prostějov were forcibly relegated, because their stadium did not meet the Football Association criteria. In the 2015–16 season, 1. SK Prostějov won the Moravian-Silesian Football League and were promoted to the second-tier Czech National Football League.

Historical names
 1904 Sportovní kroužek Prostějov
 1907 SK Prostějov
 1948 Sokol Prostějov II
 1950 Sokol ČSSZ Prostějov
 1953 Tatran Prostějov
 1957 Slovan Prostějov
 1959 TJ Železárny Prostějov
 1990 SK Prostějov fotbal
 1995 SK LeRK Prostějov (following merger with FC LeRK Brno)
 2006 1.SK Prostějov

Players

Current squad
.

Out on loan

European competitions
Prostějov competed in the 1936 and 1937 editions of the Mitropa Cup, reaching the quarter finals in 1936.

References

External links
  

Sport in Prostějov
Association football clubs established in 1904
Prostejov, SK
Prostejov, SK